"It's a Shame" is a song co-written by Stevie Wonder, Syreeta Wright and Lee Garrett and produced by Wonder as a single for the Spinners on Motown's V.I.P. Records label. The single became the Detroit-reared group's biggest single on the Motown Records company since they had signed with the company in 1964 and also their biggest hit in a decade.

The lineup of the Spinners include original members Pervis Jackson, Henry Fambrough, Billy Henderson and Bobby Smith and lead vocalist G.C. Cameron. The quintet recorded the single in 1970.

The song, which is about a man who complains about a lover's "messin' around" on him, became a huge hit for the group reaching number-fourteen on the Billboard Hot 100 and number-three on the R&B singles chart, making it one of their biggest hits to date. The song was the first song Wonder produced for another act by himself.

Two years later, the group would leave Motown for a contract with Atlantic Records on the advice of fellow Detroit native Aretha Franklin, also an artist on that label. Cameron, who was having an affair with Gwen Gordy Fuqua (sister of Motown founder Berry Gordy) decided to stay in Motown and the group hired Cameron's cousin Philippé Wynne to replace him. Later, Cameron moved with the Gordys to Los Angeles, and stayed with Motown for over a decade. In 2003 Paul Jackson Jr. performed a cover on the electric guitar from his album Still Small Voice.

Beverly Dewitt Yancey, the father of hip-hop producer J Dilla, claims to have ghostwritten the song and sold it to Motown, but the song’s attributed writers dispute this.

Television performance
The Spinners performed "It's a Shame" and other hits on The Midnight Special television program on July 23, 1976 (season 4, episode 37).  The group hosted the show that week.

Chart performance

Weekly chart

Year-end charts

Credits
Lead vocals by G.C. Cameron
Background vocals by Bobby Smith, Pervis Jackson, Henry Fambrough and Billy Henderson
Instrumentation by Stevie Wonder and the Funk Brothers
Arranged by Paul Riser

References

External links
 

1970 songs
1970 singles
The Spinners (American group) songs
Motown singles
Songs written by Stevie Wonder
Songs written by Syreeta Wright
Songs written by Lee Garrett